Timothy Antonio "T. J." Yeldon Jr. (born October 2, 1993) is an American football running back who is a free agent. He was drafted by the Jacksonville Jaguars in the second round of the 2015 NFL Draft. He played college football at Alabama.

Early years
Yeldon attended Daphne High School in Daphne, Alabama, where he played football and ran track for the Trojans athletic teams. Yeldon first played varsity football as a freshman in 2008, being called up to play slot receiver and contribute on special teams, and recorded 227 rushing yards and one touchdown as well as 131 receiving yards and a score on the season. As a sophomore, Yeldon had 1,121 yards on 201 carries with 34 catches for 361 yards and one touchdown. He rushed for 148 yards on 24 carries and scored twice in a 41–19 upset of C. J. Mosley's Theodore Bobcats in the first round of the playoffs.

In his junior season, Yeldon totaled 1,112 yards and 18 scores on the ground while also catching a career-best 34 passes for 504 yards and five touchdowns. Daphne finished the year with an unbeaten 15–0 record and the 2010 Alabama 6A State Championship, beating the defending champions Hoover Buccaneers, who were on a 21-game winning streak, in the final. Yeldon scored the winning touchdown off a one-yard run with 11 minutes of play remaining.

In his senior season, Yeldon rushed for 2,193 yards on 232 carries with 31 touchdowns and won the Alabama Mr. Football Award over Hueytown's Jameis Winston, becoming the first running back to win the award since Cadillac Williams in 2000. Yeldon was also named a first-team All-State selection by the Alabama Sports Writers Association and second-team USA Today High School All-American. Daphne finished with a 10–2 record, finishing the season with a 3–13 loss to Prattville in the 6A playoffs.

Yeldon was also on the school's track team, where he competed as a sprinter and jumper. At the prelims of the 2010 Lionell Newell Track Meet, he ran a career-best time of 11.35 seconds in the 100 meters, placing 12th overall in the finals. He also placed 6th in the long jump at the 2010 McGill-Toolen Invitational, with a personal-best mark of 6.08 meters.

Regarded as a five-star recruit by Rivals.com, Yeldon was listed as the No. 2 running back prospect in his class, behind only Johnathan Gray. Understandably, he had scholarship offers from almost every football powerhouse, including Florida, Oregon, Penn State, and Tennessee. In June 2011, Yeldon verbally committed to Auburn. However, after the end of his senior season, he switched to Auburn's in-state rival Alabama, citing uncertainty over the Tigers' offensive coordinator position following Gus Malzahn's move to Arkansas State. Yeldon enrolled at Alabama in January 2012, right after the 2012 U.S. Army All-American Bowl.

College career
As a true freshman in 2012, Yeldon played in all 14 games, sharing time with Eddie Lacy. In his first college game, Yeldon rushed for 111 yards and a touchdown. His season high for the year was 153 yards against Georgia in the 2012 SEC Championship Game. In the 2013 BCS Championship Game victory over Notre Dame, Yeldon ran for 110 yards and had one touchdown. Yeldon finished the season with 1,108 rushing yards on 175 carries and 12 touchdowns. The 1,108 rushing yards were an Alabama freshman record and his 12 touchdowns tied Mark Ingram II's freshman touchdown record.

After Lacy entered the 2013 NFL Draft, Yeldon became Alabama's starter his sophomore season in 2013. He started 11 of 12 games, missing one game due to injury. Yeldon led the team with 1,235 yards on 207 carries and 14 touchdowns. He was named first-team All-Southeastern Conference (SEC) selection. Yeldon shared carries with Derrick Henry his junior season in 2014. He played in 13 games, rushing for 979 yards on 194 carries with 11 touchdowns.

After his junior season, Yeldon decided to forego his senior season and entered the 2015 NFL Draft.

Collegiate statistics

Professional career

Jacksonville Jaguars
Yeldon was drafted by the Jacksonville Jaguars in the second round with the 36th overall pick in the 2015 NFL Draft. He was the third running back to be selected that year.

On May 27, 2015, Yeldon signed a four-year, $5.91 million contract, with a $2.56 million signing bonus, and $3.26 million guaranteed.

2015 season
Jaguars head coach Gus Bradley named Yeldon the starting running back for the beginning of the season, ahead of veterans Denard Robinson, Toby Gerhart, and Bernard Pierce. On September 13, 2015, he made his NFL debut and carried the ball 15 times for 51 yards, while also catching three passes for 16-yards, in a 20–9 loss to the Carolina Panthers. The next game against the Miami Dolphins, Yeldon had a season-high 25 carries for 70 yards in a 23–20 victory. On October 11, 2015, he had 11 rushing attempts, 32 rushing yards, five receptions, 31 receiving yards, and scored his first career touchdown reception in a 31–38 loss to the Tampa Bay Buccaneers.

After five consecutive starts to begin his rookie campaign, Yeldon missed the Week 6 matchup against the Houston Texans due to a groin injury. He returned as the starter on October 25, rushing for season-high 115 yards on 15 carries and scored his first career rushing touchdown in a 34–31 victory over the Buffalo Bills. During a Week 14 contest against the Indianapolis Colts, he had 11 carries for 62 yards but left the game with an MCL sprain that would keep him out the following week.

2016 season
Yeldon remained part of the Jaguars' backfield in the 2016 season. In the season opener against the Green Bay Packers, he had 21 carries for 39 yards and a touchdown in the 27–23 loss. Overall, on the season, he had 465 rushing yards, one rushing touchdown, 50 receptions, 312 receiving yards, and one receiving touchdown. He was placed on injured reserve on December 26, 2016.

2017 season
After being a healthy scratch for the first six weeks of the 2017 season, on October 22, during Week 7 against the Indianapolis Colts, because of an injury to Leonard Fournette, Yeldon rushed for 122 yards, which highlighted a 58-yard touchdown, as the Jaguars shut out the Colts 27–0. Overall, he finished the regular season with 253 rushing yards, two rushing touchdowns, and 30 receptions for 224 receiving yards. The Jacksonville Jaguars won the AFC South and made the playoffs. In the Divisional Round against the Pittsburgh Steelers, he had 20 rushing yards and a rushing touchdown to go along with 57 receiving yards in the 45–42 victory. In the AFC Championship against the New England Patriots, he had 25 rushing yards in the 24–20 loss.

2018 season
Yeldon started the 2018 season with 51 rushing yards and three receptions for 18 yards and a receiving touchdown in the 20–15 victory over the New York Giants. With Leonard Fournette dealing with an injury, Yeldon had an extended role in the early season. In Week 4 against the New York Jets, he recorded 52 rushing yards, a rushing touchdown, 48 receiving yards, and a receiving touchdown in the 31–12 victory. In the following game, a loss to the Kansas City Chiefs, he recorded 122 scrimmage yards and a receiving touchdown. In Week 17, Yeldon was active but did not see any action. He and an inactive Fournette showed enough disinterest on the sideline that Jaguars Executive Vice President of Football Operations Tom Coughlin issued a statement calling the duo's behavior “disrespectful, selfish … unbecoming that of a professional football player.” He finished the 2018 season with 104 carries for 414 rushing yards and one rushing touchdown to go along with 55 receptions for 487 receiving yards and four receiving touchdowns.

Buffalo Bills

On April 22, 2019, Yeldon signed a two-year contract with the Buffalo Bills. In the 2019 season, Yeldon appeared in six games and recorded 17 carries for 63 rushing yards to go along with 13 receptions for 124 receiving yards.

Yeldon was placed on the reserve/COVID-19 list by the Bills on December 27, 2020, and activated on January 6, 2021. Yeldon played in three games for the Bills in 2020. He recorded ten carries for 70 rushing yards to go along with a 22-yard receiving touchdown.

On September 20, 2021, the San Francisco 49ers hosted Yeldon for a visit.

NFL career statistics

Personal life
Yeldon is a distant cousin of former West Virginia quarterback Pat White.

References

External links
 
 Alabama Crimson Tide bio

1993 births
Living people
People from Belle Glade, Florida
People from Daphne, Alabama
Players of American football from Alabama
African-American players of American football
American football running backs
Alabama Crimson Tide football players
Jacksonville Jaguars players
Buffalo Bills players
21st-century African-American sportspeople